O Jogo da Vida is a 1977 Brazilian drama film directed by Maurice Capovila. It is an adaptation of the short story Malagueta, Perus e Bacanaço, by João Antônio.

The film has as special guests the professional sinuca (Brazilian snooker game) players Carne Frita, Joaquinzinho (former Brazilian champion) and João Gaúcho. It features soundtrack by João Bosco and Aldir Blanc and musical direction by Radamés Gnatalli in his last work for cinema.

Cast 
 Lima Duarte...Malagueta
 Gianfrancesco Guarnieri...Perus
 Maurício do Valle...Bacanaço
 Jofre Soares...Lima (special participation)
 Myrian Muniz...Tonica (special participation)
 Martha Overbeck...Adélia (special participation)
 Maria Alves... Bacanaço's wife
 Antônio Petrin...Silveirinha
 Emmanuel Cavalcanti
 Fernando Bezerra
 Thaia Perez
 Oswaldo Campozana
 Maria Vasco
 Cavagnoli Neto
 Wanda Marchetti
 Edson Santos

Synopsis 
A trio of misfit friends, Malagueta, Perus and Bacanaço, wander through the São Paulo night planning to win money with scams and betting on cue games. On intervals, flashbacks show scenes of each one's recent past: Malagueta became homeless after his house was torn down after an eviction, Perus (named after the homonymous district), frequently quarrels with his wife for being unsatisfied with his job at a cement factory and his neighborhood, and Bacanaço is seen exploiting women, escaping a shootout and being arrested by acting on Jogo do Bicho.

Awards and nominations 
 Festival de Gramado – 1978
 Winner – Kikito de Ouro for Best Supporting Actress: Myrian Muniz
 Nominated – Best film.

References

External links 
 

Films directed by Maurice Capovila
Brazilian drama films
1970s Portuguese-language films
1977 films
Snooker films
1977 drama films